Crum may refer to:

People
Crum (surname)

Places
Crum, Lewis County, Kentucky
Crum, West Virginia
Crum Creek
Crum Hill

Other uses
Crumlin Road (HM Prison)
Computational-Representational Understanding of Mind

See also
Crumb (disambiguation)
Krumm, a surname
Crom (fictional deity)
Krum of Bulgaria